Emarginula imaizumi is a species of sea snail, a marine gastropod mollusk in the family Fissurellidae, the keyhole limpets and slit limpets.

Distribution
This species is seen in Lu-Tao and Orchid Island of Taiwan, as well as the near coast of mainland China  and Japan.

References

External links
 
 To Biodiversity Heritage Library (1 publication)

Fissurellidae
Gastropods described in 1926